Ivančići may refer to:

 Ivančići, Bosnia and Herzegovina, a village near Ilijaš
 Ivančići, Croatia, a village near Jastrebarsko